Sir Justinian Isham IV (8 July 1740 – 1 April 1818) was the 7th Baronet of Lamport and served in 1776 as High Sheriff of Northamptonshire.

Early life and education

Justinian Isham IV was born probably at Oxford, to Euseby Isham, the Vice-Chancellor of Oxford University and his wife Elizabeth (Mary) Panting. He was educated at John Roysse's Free School in Abingdon, (now Abingdon School) and later was honorary Master of Arts and Bachelor of Laws at Lincoln College, Oxford.

Baronetcy
He succeeded in 1772 to the baronetcy of Lamport and Lamport Hall on the death of his uncle Sir Edmund Isham. He then served in 1776 as High Sheriff of Northamptonshire. On 18 February 1793, he was appointed a deputy lieutenant of Northamptonshire, and died at the age of 77 years. A painting of him by an unknown artist hangs at Lamport Hall.

Sir Justinian was married on 9 September 1766 to Susannah Barrett (1744-1823), the daughter of Henry Barrett. They had several children including those who follow.

 Susannah Isham (1767-1849) married George Purcas Brietzcke (c.1778-1817) of the Secretary of States office for the Northern and Southern Territories. He was the son of Charles Brietzcke (d. 1795), who is known for his diary.
 Sir Justinian Isham (1773-1845) became the 8th Baronet of Lamport.
 Reverend Vere Isham (1774-1845) became Rector of Lamport, Northamptonshire.
 Reverend Henry Charles Isham (1777-1833) became Rector of Shangton, Leicestershire. The baronetcy passed to his descendants in 1976 when the 12th Baronet Sir Gyles Isham died without an heir.

See also
 List of Old Abingdonians

References

 Betham, William (1801), "Isham of Lamport, Northamptonshire" in The Baronetage of England, of the History of the English Baronets, and such Baronets of Scotland, etc, Burrell and Bransby, Ipswich, England, v. 1, p. 298-305.
 Brainard, Homer Worthington (1938), A survey of the Ishams in England and America; eight hundred and fifty years of history and genealogy, Tuttle publishing company, inc., Rutland, Vt, 672 p.
 Debrett, John (1824), "Isham, of Lamport, co. Northampton" in Debrett's Baronetage of England (Fifth Edition), G. Woodfall, London, v. 1, p. 104-107.

External links
 Portrait of Sir Justinian Isham

1740 births
1818 deaths
Baronets in the Baronetage of England
Deputy Lieutenants of Northamptonshire
High Sheriffs of Northamptonshire
People educated at Abingdon School
Alumni of Lincoln College, Oxford